The discography of Swedish indie pop group, The Radio Dept. consists of four studio albums, nine extended plays, eighteen singles and one compilation album. The Radio Dept. was formed in 1995 by Johan Duncanson, although they did not start recording until 2001. They were signed to Labrador Records the same year and have stayed with the label since. The band's lineup has changed over the years until it settled on the trio of Johan Duncanson and Martin Carlberg, with Daniel Tjäder on keyboards.

Their first album, Lesser Matters, was released to critical acclaim, although with little chart success outside of Sweden. It received rave reviews, achieving 'universal acclaim' status from Metacritic, and was ranked the 9th best album of 2004 by NME magazine. The album attracted enough attention for film producer Sofia Coppola to use three of The Radio Dept.'s songs for her film, Marie Antoinette.

Pet Grief, the band's second album, was received less well critically, although it charted higher in Sweden. There was a four-year break before their third album, Clinging to a Scheme was released in 2010. This album was received much better than Pet Grief and was the band's first album to chart in the USA, reaching no. 20 on the Billboard "Heatseekers" chart (which consists of the top 20 albums by artists that have never made the top 100). It featured on many end-of-year lists, including Pitchfork Media's 2010 Readers' Poll.

In July 2016, the band announced their fourth studio album, Running Out of Love which was released on 21 October of that year.

The Radio Dept. released their single Going Down Swinging in August 2018.

Albums

Studio albums

Compilation albums

Extended plays

To date, The Radio Dept. have released nine extended plays, and one split EP with Peruvian band Resplandor.

Singles

Other appearances

Compilation appearances

The Radio Dept. have made 40 compilation appearances since 2002.

Soundtrack appearances

The Radio Dept.'s music has appeared in three film soundtracks throughout their career, most notably Sofia Coppola's Marie Antoinette.

Other songs

References

External links
http://theradiodept.com/discography

Pop music group discographies
Discographies of Swedish artists